Castlebellingham railway station served the village of Castlebellingham on the Dublin to Belfast railway line between Drogheda railway station and Dundalk railway station. It was north of where the line branched to Ardee. The station opened on 1 April 1851, closed to goods on 2 December 1974 and was finally closed on 6 September 1976.

Proposals were made by businessman Larry Goodman in January 2009 that included reopening the station.

References

Disused railway stations in County Louth
Railway stations opened in 1851
Railway stations closed in 1976
1851 establishments in Ireland

Railway stations in the Republic of Ireland opened in 1851